Sase Narain    (27 January 1925 – 25 August 2020) was a Guyanese politician and lawyer. He served as Speaker of the National Assembly of Guyana from 1971 to 1992, becoming the longest serving Speaker in Guyana.

Early life
Sase Narain was born in Pouderoyen, Essequibo Islands-West Demerara, British Guiana, and attended the Modern Educational Institute in Georgetown. After finishing high school, he went to the United Kingdom to study law. In 1957, he graduated from the City Law School in London.

When he returned to Guyana, Narain became the President of the Sanatan Dharma Maha Sabha.

Speaker of the National Assembly
In 1991, Narain became the first Speaker of Guyana’s National Assembly to expel a Member of Parliament after Minister of Agriculture Isahak Basir threw a drinking glass at Narain.

Later career
After leaving the National Assembly, Narain resumed his law practice.  He retired in 2012.

Death
Narain died on 25 August 2020 in Queenstown, Georgetown at the age of 95.  Former Prime Minister Hamilton Green praised him for "his candor and his wisdom".

Honours
   Order of Roraima, Guyana
   Companion of the Order of St Michael and St George, UK (1969)

References

1925 births
2020 deaths
Alumni of City, University of London
20th-century Guyanese lawyers
People from Essequibo Islands-West Demerara
Speakers of the National Assembly (Guyana)
Guyanese Senior Counsel
Guyanese appointees to the Order of St Michael and St George